The Mussabini Medal was a sports award recognising the coaches of British sports people and teams, named after Sam Mussabini. Mussabini, who died in 1927, is considered to be the first professional (paid) coach in sport, breaking the occupation's amateur (voluntary) public school roots. Introduced in 1998, it was awarded annually as part of the UK Coaching Awards organised by sports coach UK (the National Coaching Foundation) until 2007, when the 2008 awards categories onwards were renamed and expanded as part of the launch of the UK Coaching Framework.

The Mussabini Medal celebrated "the contribution of coaches of UK performers who have achieved outstanding success on the world stage." Along with the Mussabini Medal, there also existed The Dyson Award, for "individuals who have made a sustained and significant contribution to the development and management of coaching and individual coaches in the UK". This award was named after Geoff Dyson, the first chief national athletics coach, who died in 1981.

The Mussabini Medal was introduced in conjunction with the launch of the Coaching Hall of Fame. The medal and associated awards were launched to raise the profile of coaches, and increase the financial backing to enhance the profession, still seen at the time as a largely amateur vocation in spite of Mussabini's pioneering example. Speaking at the inaugural presentation the patron of the Foundation the Princess Royal stated that "Coaching and the work of individual coaches lies at the heart of sport, Yet all too often the role and contribution of the coach remains unrecognised and unacknowledged".

The Mussabini Medal was awarded to solely British coaches in the first two years, with 2000 being the first time foreign coaches of British athletes were recognised.

Winners

See also
 List of sport awards
 Sport in the United Kingdom
 UK Sport (public body)

References

British sports trophies and awards
British sports coaches
Coaching awards
Awards established in 1998
Awards disestablished in 2008
1998 establishments in the United Kingdom
2008 disestablishments in the United Kingdom